There are over one hundred parochial and private schools in the Washington Metropolitan Area.

Private schools

Washington, D.C.
Acton Academy of Washington, DC (PS-8)
Aidan Montessori School (PS-6)
Archbishop Carroll High School (9–12)
Beauvoir, The National Cathedral Elementary School (PS-3)
 British School of Washington (PS-12)
Capitol Hill Day School (PS-8)
Calvary Christian Academy (PS-8)
Dupont Park Adventist School (PS-3)
Edmund Burke School (6–12)
Emerson Preparatory School (9–12)
The Field School (6–12)
Georgetown Day School (PS-12)
Georgetown Visitation Preparatory School (9–12)
Gonzaga College High School (9–12)
Kendall Demonstration Elementary School
Kirov Academy of Ballet (7–12)
Lab School of Washington (1–12)
Lowell School (PS-8)
Maret School (K–12)
Model Secondary School for the Deaf (9–12)
Milton Gottesman Jewish Day School (Prek-8)
Nannie Helen Burroughs School (K–6)
National Cathedral School (4–12)
National Presbyterian School (PS-6)
Parkmont School (6–12)
Russian Embassy School in Washington, D.C.
St. Albans School (4–12)
St. Jerome Institute (9-12)
St. John's College High School (9–12)
St. Patrick's Episcopal Day School (PS-8)
Sheridan School (K–8)
Sidwell Friends School (PS-12)
Templeton Academy DC (9–12)
Washington International School (PS-12)

Maryland
Academy of the Holy Cross, Kensington (9–12)
 Ascension Lutheran School, Landover Hills (K–8)
Auburn School, Silver Spring and Baltimore (K–8)
Barrie School, Silver Spring (PS-12)
The Beddow Junior and Senior High School, Accokeek (7–12)
Bullis School, Potomac (3–12)
Charles E. Smith Jewish Day School, Rockville (K–12)
Chelsea School, Hyattsville (5–12)
Christ Episcopal School, Rockville (PS-8)
Concord Hill School, Chevy Chase (PS-3)
Connelly School of the Holy Child, Potomac (6–12)
DeMatha Catholic High School, Hyattsville (9–12)
Elizabeth Seton High School, Hyattsville (9-12)
Friends Community School, College Park (K–8)
Georgetown Preparatory School, North Bethesda (9–12)
German School, Potomac (PS-12)
Grace Episcopal Day School, Kensington (PS-8)
Green Acres School, Rockville (PS-8)
Good Counsel High School, Olney (9-12)
Holton-Arms School, Bethesda (3–12)
 Holy Trinity Episcopal Day School, Bowie (PK-8)
Landon School, Bethesda (3–12)
Maryland International Day School, Ft. Washington (PK-8)
McLean School of Maryland, Potomac (K–12)
Melvin J. Berman Hebrew Academy, Rockville (PK-12)
Mysa Micro School, Bethesda (6–12)
New Hope Academy, Landover Hills (K–12)
Norwood School, Bethesda (K–8)
St. Andrew's Episcopal School, Potomac (PS-12)
St. John's Episcopal School, Olney (PS-8)
Sandy Spring Friends School, Sandy Spring (PS-12)
 Washington Episcopal School, Bethesda (PS-8)
Washington Waldorf School, Bethesda (PS-12)
The Woods Academy, Bethesda (PK-8)
Wye River Upper School, Centreville (9-12)

Virginia
Accotink Academy, Springfield, (Grades 1st-12 serving ages 6-21)
Ad Fontes Academy, Centreville (PK-12)
Alexandria Country Day School, Alexandria (K–8)
Auburn School, Chantilly (K–12)
Basilica School of Saint Mary's (PK-8)
Bishop Ireton High School, Alexandria (9-12)
Bishop O'Connell High School, Arlington (9–12)
Browne Academy, Alexandria (PS-8)
Burgundy Farm Country Day School, Alexandria (PS-8)
Commonwealth Academy, Alexandria (6–12) 
Episcopal High School, Alexandria (9–12)
Flint Hill School, Oakton (PS-12)
Grace Episcopal School, Alexandria (PS-5)
Green Hedges School, Vienna (PS-8)
GW Community School (9-12)
King Abdullah Academy (K-12)
The Langley School, McLean (PS-8)
Loudoun Country Day School, Leesburg (PS-8)
Madeira School, McLean (9–12)
Merritt Academy, Fairfax (PS-8)
Metropolitan School of the Arts Academy, Lorton (7–12)
Middleburg Academy, Middleburg (9–12)
Montessori School of Northern Virginia, Annandale (PS-6)
Oakwood School, Alexandria (K-8) 
Paul VI Catholic High School, Fairfax (9-12)
Potomac School, McLean (K–12)
Randolph-Macon Academy, Front Royal (6-12)
The River Farm Cooperative, Alexandria (K–5)
St. Stephens & St. Agnes School, Alexandria (PS-12)
Trinity School at Meadow View, Falls Church (6-12)
Trinity Christian School, Fairfax, VA, (K-12)
 Westminster School, Annandale (PK-Grade 8)

 Former
 Islamic Saudi Academy (K-12)

Catholic schools

The Roman Catholic Archdiocese of Washington (Catholic Schools) operates Catholic schools in DC and in Maryland suburbs.
The Roman Catholic Diocese of Arlington operates Catholic schools in the Virginia suburbs.

Washington, D.C.
 6-12 schools
 St. Anselm's Abbey School (Saint Anselm's Abbey)

 High schools (9–12)
 Archbishop Carroll High School 
 Georgetown Preparatory School
 Georgetown Visitation Preparatory School (Georgetown Visitation Monastery)
 Gonzaga College High School
 St. John's College High School

 K-8/PreK-8 schools
Annuciation School
Blessed Sacrament School
Holy Trinity School (PK-8)
Our Lady of Victory School (PreK3-8)
St. Augustine Catholic School (PK-8)
St. Anthony's School
St. Francis Xavier Academy (PreK-8)
St. Peter School (PK-8)
St. Thomas More Catholic Academy (PK-8)
Sacred Heart School

 Middle schools (6-8)
 San Miguel School

4-8 schools
Washington Jesuit Academy

 3-8 schools
 Washington School for Girls

 Former schools
Holy Redeemer School (PS-8)
Lt. Joseph P. Kennedy Institute (K–12)

Maryland
This list only includes schools under the Washington Archdiocese that are in Montgomery and Prince George's counties.

 K-12 schools
 The Avalon School, Gaithersburg
 Brookewood School, Kensington

 1-12 schools
 Stone Ridge School of the Sacred Heart, Bethesda

 3-12 schools
The Heights School, Potomac

 6-12 schools
 Connelly School of the Holy Child

 High schools
 Academy of the Holy Cross
 Bishop McNamara High School
 DeMatha Catholic High School
 Don Bosco Cristo Rey High School
 Elizabeth Seton High School
 Our Lady of Good Counsel High School
 St. Vincent Pallotti High School

 K-8/PreK-8 schools (Prince George's County)
 The Academy of Saint Matthias the Apostle (Lanham) (PreK-8)
 Holy Redeemer School (College Park) (PreK-8)
 Saint Ambrose School (Cheverly) (PreK-8)
 Saint Columba School (Oxon Hill) (PreK-8)
 Saint Jerome Academy  (Hyattsville) (PreK-8)
 Saint John the Evangelist School (Clinton) (PreK-8)
 Saint Joseph Regional Catholic School (Beltsville) (PreK-8)
 Saint Mary of the Assumption School (near Upper Marlboro) (PreK-8)
 Saint Mary of the Mills School (Laurel)
 Saint Mary School (Landover Hills) (PreK-8)
 Saint Mary's School of Piscataway (Clinton)
 Saint Philip the Apostle School (Marlow Heights) (PreK-8)
 St. Pius X Regional School (Bowie) (PreK-8)

 Others
Holy Family School, Temple Hills (PS-8)
Immaculate Conception School (PS-6)
Mater Dei School, Bethesda (1–8)
St. Philip The Apostle School, Suitland (PS-8)

Virginia
 High schools
 Bishop Denis J. O'Connell High School
 Bishop Ireton High School
 John Paul the Great Catholic High School
 Oakcrest School
 Paul VI Catholic High School

See also 
District of Columbia Public Schools

References

External links
Rankings of the best high schools in the DC metro area

 
Parochial
Washington, D.C.